Patillas Airport  was a public airport  south of the small town of Patillas, in Puerto Rico.

Google Earth Historical Imagery (12/12/2014) shows an east-west  asphalt runway. The (7/14/2015) image shows the runway marked closed. Current imagery (1/1/2018) shows the runway area now used for industrial storage.

See also

Transport in Puerto Rico
List of airports in Puerto Rico

References

External links
OpenStreetMap - Patillas Airport closed

Defunct airports in Puerto Rico
Airports in Puerto Rico